Una mujer is a Mexican telenovela produced by Televisa for Telesistema Mexicano in 1965.

Cast 
Ramón Bugarini
Sandra Chávez
Andrea Cotto
Malena Doria

References

External links 

Mexican telenovelas
1965 telenovelas
Televisa telenovelas
Spanish-language telenovelas
1965 Mexican television series debuts
1965 Mexican television series endings